State Route 72 (SR-72) is a  state highway in the U.S. state of Utah. The current alignment is an extension of SR-10. The highway provides access to Loa from Interstate 70 (I-70).

Route description

The highway begins in Loa and proceeds north towards Fremont and across Fishlake National Forest. The portion across Fishlake National Forest is frequently closed during winter weather. While in the national forest the highway passes by landmarks such as Foy Bench and The Frying Pan. The highway ends where SR-10 begins. This is near the Ivie Creek Rest Area along I-70. This junction is called Fremont Junction by most maps and the Utah legislature. Aside from the rest area, no permanent structures exist at this location.

History
State Route 121 was created in 1931, connecting SR-24 at Loa with Fremont. Two years later, the route was renumbered 72 and extended to Fremont Junction on SR-10. State Route 250 was created in 1953 as a connection from SR-24 between Loa and Lyman north to the 90° turn in SR-72, but was given back to the county in 1969.

With the completion of I-70 along SR-10's alignment, most of the old road was relinquished to Sevier County in 1976. Since there was no interchange at Fremont Junction, SR-72 was extended east about two miles (3 km) to the point where I-70 left the SR-10 alignment to cross the San Rafael Swell. (A short piece of old SR-10 west of SR-72 was restored to the state highway system in 1978 as SR-76.)

Major intersections

References

072
 072
 072